XHKJ-FM is a radio station on 89.7 FM in Acapulco, Guerrero. It is owned by Grupo Radiorama and carries its Vida format.

History
XEKJ-AM 1400 received its concession in 1943, two years after beginning operation. It was Guerrero's first radio station, owned by María del Refugio Acosta de Valdivieso and broadcast with 500 watts day and 250 watts night. Ramón Ortega Escobedo bought XEKJ in 1947 and sold it to Radio Mar, S.A. in 1956. XEKJ later began broadcasting with 1,000 watts.

XEKJ was cleared for AM-FM migration in 2011 as XHKJ-FM 89.7. Its tower was approved to move to Cerro de los Lirios in 2017.

References

Radio stations in Guerrero
Radio stations established in 1941